Bojan Pavlović (Serbian Cyrillic: Бојан Павловић; born February 1, 1985) is a Serbian footballer manager and former player who currently the manager of China League Two side Xi'an Daxing Chongde.

Playing career 
Pavlović played in the Serbian SuperLiga in 2007 with FK Borac Čačak. During his tenure with Borac he featured in the 2008–09 UEFA Cup against FC Dacia Chișinău, and PFC Lokomotiv Sofia. In 2009, he signed with Cukaricki Stankom, and later played with FK Metalac Gornji Milanovac. In 2010, he played abroad in the Nemzeti Bajnokság I with Kaposvári Rákóczi FC. In 2014, he played in the Croatian First Football League for three seasons with NK Istra 1961. He later played in the Canadian Soccer League with Serbian White Eagles FC for the 2018 season.

Managerial career 
Pavlović began managing in 2019 with Xi'an Daxing Chongde in the China League Two.
In July 2020 Pavlović began managing China League Two team Shanxi Longjin.

Managerial stats

References

1985 births
Living people
Sportspeople from Kragujevac
Serbian footballers
Serbian football managers
Association football midfielders
Serbian SuperLiga players
Croatian Football League players
Nemzeti Bajnokság I players
Canadian Soccer League (1998–present) players
FK Borac Čačak players
FK Čukarički players
FK Metalac Gornji Milanovac players
Kaposvári Rákóczi FC players
NK Istra 1961 players
Serbian White Eagles FC players
Serbian expatriate footballers
Expatriate footballers in Hungary
Serbian expatriate sportspeople in Hungary
Serbian expatriate sportspeople in China
Expatriate football managers in China